Worksop Town Hall is a municipal building in Potter Street, Worksop, Nottinghamshire, England. The town hall, which was the headquarters of Worksop Urban District Council, is a Grade II listed building.

History

The building was originally commissioned by a group of local investors who invested £5,000 to establish a corn exchange: the site they selected had been occupied by a row of houses. The new corn exchange was designed by Isaac Charles Gilbert in the Italianate style, built in red brick with stone dressings and was officially opened with an event attended by the lord of the manor, the Duke of Newcastle, in July 1851.

The design involved a symmetrical main frontage with five bays facing onto the Potter Street with the end bays slightly projected forward; the central section of three bays originally featured a flight of steps leading up to three doorways with carved keystones; the carved Royal coat of arms was installed on the front of the building. There was an aediculed casement window flanked by two hooded casement windows on the first floor and an open pediment containing a clock, which had been donated by the Duke of Newcastle, above. The outer bays featured casement windows flanked by Ionic order colonettes supporting curved pediments and there was a central belfry on the roof. Internally, the principal rooms included a courtroom, which was used for petty sessions, and an assembly room, which was used by the county court. On the ground floor, alongside the corn exchange hall itself, a library was established for use by the Reading Society and by the Mechanics Institute.

In the 1870s, a collapse in corn prices caused by international competition precipitated financial difficulties and the local board of health acquired the building in 1882. Following a significant increase in population, largely associated with coal mining, the town became an urban district, with the corn exchange as its town hall, in 1894. The library, which became accessible by the general public, relocated to Watson Road in 1902.

A war memorial to commemorate the lives of local service personnel who had died in the Second Boer War was designed and made by local sculptor, George Colton. It took the form of a Carrara marble tablet which was installed on the right hand side of the building and unveiled by Field Marshal Lord Grenfell on 1 August 1903. The area was advanced to the status of municipal borough with the town hall as its headquarters in 1931.

In the 1970s a two-storey, 18th century house to the east of the town hall on Potter Street was remodelled with an archway for vehicles replacing the old shopfront. At the same the steps leading up to the town hall were removed and the doorways replaced with three round headed windows – access to the building was then obtained through the new archway. Following local government reorganisation in 1974, the enlarged Bassetlaw District Council initially used offices in Victoria Square. Queen Elizabeth II opened new council offices further along Potter Street on 5 June 1981. A major programme of refurbishment works to the town hall was completed in August 2007.

References

Government buildings completed in 1851
City and town halls in Nottinghamshire
Worksop
Grade II listed buildings in Nottinghamshire